Bill Harlow (born May 30, 1950) is a retired U.S. Navy captain, author, and public relations specialist. He has been the top spokesperson for the Central Intelligence Agency (CIA) and worked in the White House dealing with National Security Media issues.

Publications

Circle William 
Circle William is a novel about two brothers. One brother, Jim, is the White House Press Secretary and his younger brother, Bill, is the captain of the USS Winston Churchill. When the United States' Government learns of Libya's plan to drop chemical weapons on the Israeli Knesset, they must work together. Their first step is to prepare for a chemical, nuclear, or germ attack otherwise known as to set a "Circle William." What complicates their mission is Washington Post journalist, Sue O'Dell, who plants to write a feature on Bill.

Hard Measures: How Aggressive CIA Actions After 9/11 Saved American Lives 
Harlow co-authored this book with Jose A. Rodriguez, Jr, a former CIA undercover officer before he joined the CIA Counterterrorism Center. The book goes in-depth into Rodriquez's experience.  The authors claim that aggressive measures such as enhanced interrogation saved American lives after the September 11th attacks

At the Center of the Storm: My Years at the CIA 
Harlow co-authored this book with George Tenet. This book is the narration of Tenet's time at the CIA particularly the time surrounding the September 11th attacks.  According to the authors, the book demonstrates the CIA's attempts to prepare the United States against numerous threats, understand the events that led to 9/11, and explain and offer information that led to the 2003 invasion of Iraq. Tenet and Harlow offer their interpretations on President George W. Bush's "sixteen words" in his 2003 State of the Union Address and Tenet's true context of his "slam dunk" comment.

The Great War of Our Time: The CIA's Fight Against Terrorism: From al Qa'ida to ISIS 
Harlow co-authored this book with Michael Morell, a former acting director and deputy director of the CIA.

Professional life 
Harlow retired from the Navy with the rank of captain in 1997. He then became the chief of public affairs for the CIA. Additionally, Harlow has been the Navy's depute spokesperson in Europe, special assistant to the Secretary of the Navy and as an assistant White House Press Secretary for national security and foreign affairs.

Personal life 
Harlow's parents are both U.S. Navy veterans. Currently, he lives in northern Virginia.

References 

1950 births
Living people
Writers from Virginia
21st-century American historians
21st-century American male writers
Place of birth missing (living people)
United States Navy officers
American public relations people
People of the Central Intelligence Agency
American male non-fiction writers